Tommaso d'Aquino, C.R. (1584–1651) was a Roman Catholic prelate who served as Bishop of Mottola (1648–1651).

Biography
Tommaso d'Aquino was born in Naples and ordained a priest in the Congregation of Clerics Regular of the Divine Providence. On 8 February 1648, he was selected as Bishop of Mottola and confirmed by Pope Innocent X on 24 August 1648. On 20 September 1648, he was consecrated bishop by Pier Luigi Carafa, Cardinal-Priest of Santi Silvestro e Martino ai Monti, with Fausto Caffarelli, Archbishop of Santa Severina, and Ranuccio Scotti Douglas, Bishop of Borgo San Donnino, serving as co-consecrators. He served as Bishop of Mottola until his death in 1650.

References

External links and additional sources
 (for Chronology of Bishops)
 (for Chronology of Bishops)

17th-century Italian Roman Catholic bishops
Bishops appointed by Pope Innocent X
1584 births
1651 deaths
Clergy from Naples
Theatine bishops